
Tianxing may refer to:

Locations in China

Towns
Tianxing, Lu County (天兴), a town in Lu County, Sichuan
Tianxing, Qu County (天星), a town in Qu County, Sichuan
Tianxing, Daguan County (天星), a town in Daguan County, Yunnan

Townships
Tianxing Township, Chongqing (天星乡), in Wuxi County, Chongqing
Tianxing Township, Hubei (天兴乡), in Wuhan, Hubei
Tianxing Township, Guizhou (天星乡), in Cengong County, Guizhou
Tianxing Township, Nanchong (天星乡), in Nanchong, Sichuan
Tianxing Township, Wangcang County (天星乡), in Wangcang County, Sichuan
Tianxing Township, Qiubei County (天星乡), in Qiubei County, Yunnan

Historical eras
Tianxing (天興, 398–404), era name used by Emperor Daowu of Northern Wei
Tianxing (天興, 617–620), era name used by Liu Wuzhou
Tianxing (天興, 1232–1234), era name used by Emperor Aizong of Jin

See also
Tian Hongzheng (764–821), originally named Tian Xing, Tang dynasty general